Claussio dos Santos Dimas (born 8 October 1978), known as Pituca, is a Brazilian former footballer who played professionally as a midfielder.

Career
Pituca spent much of his playing career with Atlético Clube Goianiense, but joined arch-rivals Clube Recreativo e Atlético Catalano in 2015.

Honours
Pituca has won the Goiano Championship with Atlético Clube Goianiense twice.
2007 and 2010.

Pituca had the title of champion of the Brazilian National Tournament of 3rd Division (with Atlético Clube Goianiense) in 2008.

References

External links
 Profile at iG.com.br
zerozerofootball.com

1978 births
Living people
People from São Luís, Maranhão
Brazilian footballers
Association football midfielders
Brasiliense Futebol Clube players
Atlético Clube Goianiense players
Associação Atlética Ponte Preta players
Goiás Esporte Clube players
Paraná Clube players
Campeonato Brasileiro Série A players
Sportspeople from Maranhão